The Jupiter novels are dedicated to novels patterned after Robert A. Heinlein's classic inspirational tales for young adults and adults. 
The Jupiter novels is a series of science fiction novels from Tor Books featuring stories about young men and women. The series includes books from authors Charles Sheffield, Jerry Pournelle, and James P. Hogan. These fast-paced hard science fiction series follow young characters coming of age in space-faring organizations, learning about the threatening universe and making tough moral decisions. Unlike the Ender Wiggin books, each book in the Jupiter novels features a different cast. 

The series includes the following books:

 Higher Education (1995) by Charles Sheffield and Jerry Pournelle
 The Billion Dollar Boy (1997) by Charles Sheffield
 Putting Up Roots (1997) by Charles Sheffield
 The Cyborg from Earth (1998) by Charles Sheffield
 Starswarm (1999) by Jerry Pournelle
 Outward Bound (1999) by James P. Hogan

References

Jupiter

Jupiter